Annemarie van Haeringen (born 16 February 1959) is a Dutch illustrator. She won the Gouden Penseel award three times: in 1999, 2000 and 2005.

She has illustrated books for numerous Dutch authors, including Tonke Dragt, Ted van Lieshout and Bette Westera.

In 2019, she published the picture book De dag waarop de draak verdween with illustrations made entirely using ballpoint pens. In that same year, the book Laat een boodschap achter in het zand (written by Bibi Dumon Tak) with her illustrations was on the shortlist for the Jan Wolkers Prijs.

Selected works 
Annemarie van Haeringen has published a number of books, including:

 De dag waarop de draak verdween
 Laat een boodschap achter in het zand
 Mijn Mama (in English published by Gecko Press as My Mama)
 Een hapje voor Kleine Ezel, text by Rindert Kromhout (in English published by Gecko Press as Eat Up, Little Donkey)

References

External links 
 Annemarie van Haeringen (in Dutch), Digital Library for Dutch Literature

Living people
1959 births
Dutch children's book illustrators
Dutch women illustrators